Mae Na Chon is a tambon (subdistrict) of Mae Chaem District, in Chiang Mai Province, Thailand. In 2005 it had a population of 10,184 people. The tambon contains 19 villages.

References

Tambon of Chiang Mai province
Populated places in Chiang Mai province